Prescottville is an unincorporated community in Jefferson County, in the U.S. state of Pennsylvania.

History
The first settlement at Prescottville was made in 1853. A post office called Prescottville was established in 1889, and remained in operation until 1913.

References

Unincorporated communities in Jefferson County, Pennsylvania
Unincorporated communities in Pennsylvania